Hypsirhynchus funereus, the Jamaican black racer, Jamaican black racerlet, or Jamaican black ground snake, is a species of snake in the family Colubridae.  The species is native to Jamaica.

References

Hypsirhynchus
Reptiles of Jamaica
Endemic fauna of Jamaica
Taxa named by Edward Drinker Cope
Reptiles described in 1862